Stanback is a surname. Notable people with the surname include:

Anne Stanback (born 1958), American activist
Harry Stanback (born 1958), American football player
Haskel Stanback (born 1952), American football player
Isaiah Stanback (born 1984), American football player
Isreal Pinkney Stanback businessman and philanthropist from Columbia, South Carolina who the I. P. Stanback Museum developed by Leo Twiggs is named for